Final Four of the Adriatic League to be played from 24–25 March 2018 in the Montana, Bulgaria.

Semifinals

For third place

Final

Bracket

Notes
 All times given below are in Eastern European Time / Eastern European Summer Time.

References

External links
Official website

Final Four